

Vaindloo Lighthouse (Estonian: Vaindloo tuletorn) is a lighthouse located on the island of Vaindloo (in the Gulf of Finland), in Estonia. The lighthouse was originally built in Vormsi, however it was moved to Vaindloo in 1871, when the old beacon had collapsed. The lighthouse serves as a signal on the shipping routes between the Estonian town of Kunda and the Finnish town of Porvoo. The first lighthouse built on the island of Vaindloo was ordered by Tsar Peter the Great in the year of 1718.

See also 

 List of lighthouses in Estonia

References

External links 

 

Lighthouses completed in 1871
Resort architecture in Estonia
Lighthouses in Estonia
Haljala Parish
Buildings and structures in Lääne-Viru County